Christopher Maltman (born 6 February 1970) is a British operatic baritone who has appeared internationally. He sang many leading roles first at the Royal Opera House, the title role of Enescu's Œdipe at the Salzburg Festival, and Jochanaan in Salome by Richard Strauss at the Oper Frankfurt. He made many recordings of song repertoire.

Life and career 
Maltman was born in Cleethorpes, England, and was educated at Warwick University where he received a degree in Biochemistry. He subsequently studied music at the Royal Academy of Music. In 1997 he received the Lieder Prize at the BBC Cardiff Singer of the World Competition. He made his debut with The Royal Opera in 1997 and has since sung over fifteen principal roles there including Don Carlo di Vargas in Verdi's La forza del destino, Conte di Luna in Il trovatore, Enrico in Donizetti's Lucia di Lammermoor, Papageno in Mozart's Die Zauberflöte, Count Almaviva in Le nozze di Figaro, Guglielmo in Così fan tutte, the Forester in Janacek's The Cunning Little Vixen, and Lescaut in Puccini's Manon Lescaut. He has entered an international career in the great opera houses of Europe and North America specialising in Italian dramatic baritone repertoire, especially the role of Verdi's Rigoletto, but also Rodrigo in Don Carlo, the title role of Simon Boccanegra, Ford in Falstaff, and Guy de Montfort in Les Vêpres siciliennes.

Maltman appeared at the Salzburg Festival in the title role of Enescu's Œdipe in 2019. In 2020, he performed first the role of Jochanaan in Salome by Richard Strauss, at the Oper Frankfurt, directed by Barrie Kosky and conducted by Joana Mallwitz, alongside Ambur Braid in the title role. A reviewer noted his firm but lyrical voice. 

In 2019 he became engaged to the French conductor and pianist, Audrey Saint-Gil.

Recordings 
Maltman recorded Vaughan Williams's Serenade to Music, and participated in a project to record all of Beethoven Folk Songs. He recorded Schumann's Dichterliebe and Liederkreis, Op. 24, with pianist Graham Johnson, a Debussy album with pianist Malcolm Martineau, and  English songs with Roger Vignoles. He appeared in a film of John Adams' The Death of Klinghoffer.

Maltman has taken part in several broadcast performances later issued on video, and appeared as Mozart's Don Giovanni in the 2009 Kasper Holten film Juan.

References

External links 
 
 
 
  Baritone Christopher Maltman (management) askonasholt.com
 Christopher Maltman operabase.com
 Christopher Maltman (baritone) Hyperion Records

Living people
Alumni of the Royal Academy of Music
English operatic baritones
People educated at King Edward VI Grammar School, Louth
Musicians from Lincolnshire
British baritones
20th-century British male opera singers
21st-century British male opera singers
BBC Radio 3 New Generation Artists
1970 births